Große Sülze is a river of Saxony-Anhalt, Germany. It flows into the Schrote near Barleben. In English, Große Sülze means 'Big Brawn'. The following trees have been planted along its banks: Field Maple, Sycamore, Hornbeam, Ash and Linden.

See also
List of rivers of Saxony-Anhalt

Rivers of Saxony-Anhalt
Rivers of Germany

References